Newbridge RFC is an Irish rugby club based in County Kildare, playing in Division 2A of the Leinster League.

History
The club was founded in 1996 after the amalgamation of the Curragh and Old Kilcullen clubs.

Close to the end of the 1995/1996 season, it seemed clear that the future of rugby in County Kildare was under threat. Despite them having very successful youth teams, both the Curragh and Old Kilcullen clubs were struggling a great deal because of those players moving away. 

In May 1995, there were talks of a possible merger between them, but had fizzled out by August of that year. They eventually resumed with their plans in November, with both clubs being represented by four executive members each; Curragh by Harry Quirke (President), Don O'Keeffe (Chairman), Con McNamara (a member of the original merger team) and Sean Hayes (a new member of the merger team) and Old Kilcullen by Ollie Delaney (President), Niall Kidd (Chairman), Rory O'Carroll (Secretary) and Kieran Murphy (Treasurer).

Honours

 Leinster League Division Two: Winners 2007/2008
 Leinster League Division Three: Winners 2004/2005
  North Midlands Hosie Cup Winners 1996/1997, Runners up 2009/2010.
  North Midlands Lalor Cup J2 Winners 2006/2007, Runners up 2010/2011
  North Midlands Spiers Cup J3 Winners 2007/2008
  Anderson Cup Provincial J3 Winners 1996/1997
  Dunne Cup Provincial J4 Towns Cup Winners 2009/2010
  Leinster League Division 2 2nds Winners 2005/2006
  Leinster League Division 1B, Winners 2009/2010
  Naas Floodlit Cup: 2003
  Provincial Towns Seconds Cup : Winners 2011/2012, 
  Provincial Towns Seconds Cup : Winners 2012/2013.
  North Midlands Hosie Cup : Winners 2012/2013

References
Newbridge RFC

Irish rugby union teams
Rugby clubs established in 1996
Rugby union clubs in County Kildare